Eduardo Martins Serra (born 2 October 1943) is a Portuguese cinematographer who has spent most of his career working in European film productions, mostly in French, Portuguese and British films, with frequent collaborations with directors Patrice Leconte and Claude Chabrol. Serra is best known for his work on the final two Harry Potter films, Harry Potter and the Deathly Hallows – Part 1 and Harry Potter and the Deathly Hallows – Part 2 .

From 1960 to 1963, Serra studied engineering at Lisbon's Instituto Superior Técnico, but he had to leave the country after his involvement in students' protests against Salazar's dictatorship. He settled in France, where he was accepted to Vaugirard film school in Paris; he graduated in 1966. In 1970 he got his second degree from the Paris-Sorbonne University, in Art History and Archeology.

Serra has twice been nominated for the Academy Award for Best Cinematography. His first nomination was for his work on The Wings of the Dove (1997), for which he also won a BAFTA. He received his second Academy Award and BAFTA nominations for Girl with a Pearl Earring.

In 2004, Serra received the Ordem do Infante D. Henrique, a civilian award presented for services to Portuguese culture, from President Jorge Sampaio.

Filmography 
Short film

Film

References

External links
 
 Eduardo Serra on AFC

1943 births
Living people
Best Cinematography BAFTA Award winners
European Film Award for Best Cinematographer winners
People from Lisbon
Portuguese cinematographers
University of Paris alumni